The 2016–17 season was Kilmarnock's fourth season in the Scottish Premiership and their 24th consecutive appearance in the top flight of Scottish football. Kilmarnock also competed in the Scottish Premiership, Scottish League Cup and the Scottish Cup.

Overview
Kilmarnock finished eighth in the Scottish Premiership with 41 points. They failed to qualify from the group stages of the League Cup, and lost to Hamilton Academical in the fourth round of the Scottish Cup

Match results

Friendlies

Notes

Scottish Premiership

Scottish Cup

Scottish League Cup

Group Stage

Squad statistics
During the 2016–17 season, Kilmarnock used thirty-seven different players in competitive games. The table below shows the number of appearances and goals scored by each player.

Source:

Club statistics

League table

Competition Overview

Player transfers

Transfers in

Transfers out

Notes

References

2016-17
Scottish football clubs 2016–17 season